Shaikhupur Tehsil , is an administrative subdivision (tehsil) of Shaikhupur District in the Punjab province of Pakistan. The city of Shaikhupur is the headquarters of the tehsil.

References

Tehsils of Sheikhupura District